Clément Couture (born 2 August 1939 in Saint-Camille, Quebec and died on 8 July 2021) was a member of the House of Commons of Canada from 1988 to 1993. By career, he is an industrial commissioner and administrator.

He was elected in the 1988 federal election at the Saint-Jean electoral district for the Progressive Conservative party. He served in the 34th Canadian Parliament after which he was defeated by Claude Bachand of the Bloc Québécois in the 1993 federal election.

External links

1939 births
Living people
Members of the House of Commons of Canada from Quebec
People from Estrie
Progressive Conservative Party of Canada MPs